Blitzen Trapper is a Portland, Oregon-based experimental country/folk/rock band associated with Sub Pop Records, Vagrant Records and Lojinx. Formed in 2000, the band currently operates as a quintet, with Eric Earley (guitar/harmonica/vocals/keyboard), Erik Menteer (guitar/keyboard), Brian Adrian Koch (drums/vocals/harmonica), Michael Van Pelt (bass), and Marty Marquis (guitar/keyboards/vocals/melodica). Blitzen Trapper self-released its first three albums. "Wild Mountain Nation" was No. 98 on Rolling Stones list of the 100 Best Songs of 2007.

Blitzen Trapper released its third album, Wild Mountain Nation, in 2007 to much acclaim from critics such as Pitchfork Media, The Nerve, and Spin Magazine. The group signed to Sub Pop Records in the summer of 2007.

After the release of Furr in 2008, the group received a two-page feature in Rolling Stone. The album was ranked No. 13 on Rolling Stone'''s Best Albums of 2008 while the title track was ranked No. 4 on the magazine's Best Singles of 2008. The albums Destroyer of the Void and American Goldwing followed, to similarly high acclaim.

On October 1, 2013, the band released VII, their first on Vagrant Records in the U.S.; the album also appeared on British indie label Lojinx in Europe on September 30. In mid-December 2014, the band self-published their first live album, Live In Portland, followed by the Record Store Day exclusive, a live cover album of Neil Young's Harvest record titled Live Harvest. Their eighth studio album, All Across This Land, was released on October 2, 2015. Their ninth studio release - marking a return to the band's own label LidKerCow - is titled Wild and Reckless and was released on November 3, 2017.

History

2000–2003: The Garmonbozia years

The band that would come to be known as Blitzen Trapper began life under the name Garmonbozia in the year 2000. The Portland, Oregon-based lineup consisted of songwriter/lead singer Eric Earley, Erik Menteer (guitar, keyboard), Brian Adrian Koch (drums, vocals), Michael Van Pelt (bass), Drew Laughery (keyboard), and Marty Marquis (keyboard, vocals). Many of the Garmonbozia recordings are experimental prog-rock and psychedelic songs, more concerned with creating interesting soundscapes than the tighter rock/soul/country/pop crispness of their later albums. Their first known recording as a band is untitled and incomplete; only two songs, "Something Blue," and "Oklahoma" remain. "Oklahoma" is a largely instrumental suite that nonetheless contains pop elements, while "Something Blue" is a trippier prog-rock piece incorporating sound samples, sound effects, and noise. The two approaches to these very early songs hint toward later song structures throughout their pre-label albums, up to and including their breakthrough album, Wild Mountain Nation.

In 2001, the band's output exploded, as they self-recorded four albums with homemade artwork, which they distributed at concerts. 1940, the first of the four, included an early version of "Lover Leave Me Drowning," which would later appear on the Blitzen Trapper album Destroyer of the Void. This was followed soon by the eight-track Perms, Porn & the Gestalt; unusually, the shorter songs (such as the 2:10 "Fugue in Five Parts") tend more toward the experimental, while the longest song, the 7:13 "Lover In Tow," is structurally similar to the early "Oklahoma," containing guitar-based melodies and a pop sensibility. Tremolopsi! followed, again featuring prog elements and structures; the band incorporates three fantasias on the fairly straightforward pop-rock song "Tallahassee" subtitled "Theme Variatours," for example. The band's final 2001 album, Omnibus and the Baker's Man (A Pretext For Black Movie Magic), features the first known recording of "Reno," a song that would find its way onto Blitzen Trapper's first album. The band also performed live full sets on radio stations KBOO and KPSU in 2001.

The band headed back to the studio to record 2002's Boom which contains a very early version of the song, "Sadie"; a more polished version of the song would later close Blitzen Trapper's Destroyer of the Void album in 2010. Increasingly, the band's songs were edging closer to tracks that would place on albums in the band's Blitzen Trapper incarnation; their final 2002 studio recording, R | L, included early versions of several songs that would appear on Blitzen Trapper's eponymous first record, including "AppleTrees," "The All Girl Team," and "Texaco."

The band's final statement as Garmonbozia was the studio record Duble Pepy Majik Plus, an 18-track LP expanding on the R | L track list, and boasting even more songs that would later appear on Blitzen Trapper (album), including "Donkie Boy" and "Ansel and Emily DeSader." (An EP of tracks cut from these last two studio records, titled UNRL or perhaps UNR | L, includes the first version of "Asleep For Days," which would appear on 2004's Field Rexx). None of these recordings have ever been made available commercially, although many of these records were distributed at Garmonbozia concerts in Portland, and have later surfaced occasionally on the internet.

2003–2007: Pre-label

In 2003, the band changed their name to Blitzen Trapper, reportedly a reference to singer Eric Earley's seventh-grade girlfriend, who kept a Trapper Keeper binder and drew pictures of Santa Claus and his reindeer on it, her favorite reindeer being Blitzen. Following the name change, the band finally released their first commercial album, the eponymous Blitzen Trapper, on their own label LidKerCow Ltd, in 2003. A decade later, Earley recalled the recording process:

I don't remember much about making this first record, too long ago maybe. I guess I remember this Mexican dive bar we'd go to after sessions with GW (Gregg Williams) who was engineering the record. We'd drink tequila and play pool and watch Blazers games. Drew took the cover shot down at the coast at some junk shop off the highway. An Indian and a zebra. That says it all.

On December 2, 2003, the band returned to radio station KPSU and recorded their first live show under the Blitzen Trapper name, playing songs from their first album and previewing some - including "Leopard's Will to Live" and "40 Stripes" - from their next. Despite this local publicity, the album Blitzen Trapper failed to make much of an initial impact, and was soon followed by 2004's Field Rexx, also released on LidKerCow. According to the liner notes, Rexx was "Recorded at the carny shack, fer shook n timsel on Duke's shoot-o-matic for tisks & soda & that ol' broke 4-track what 3-fingrd mike poured old English on and lit on fire." For the first time, Blitzen Trapper received some national attention; Chicago-based pop-culture review site Pitchfork reviewed the album, giving it an impressive 7.0 out of 10. Comparing the album to artists as diverse as Beck, Willie Nelson, and Rogue Wave, Pitchfork stated, "their sophomore effort shouldn't be dismissed as fluff -- Field Rexx is an earnest crack at bluegrass, country, and folk that's young and brazen enough to incorporate elements from multiple genres."

Blitzen Trapper struggled with their follow-up to Field Rexx. Eric Earley recorded a new album, simply titled Trapper, on a two-track reel-to-reel in his bedroom; like the Garmonbozia records, Trapper was not released. As a band, Blitzen Trapper recorded a full album of tracks titled Waking Bullets at Breakneck Speed (alternately titled BT3 and All Saints at various stages of its production). They worked with producers Mike Coykendall and Gregg Williams to record some tracks for the new record - recording others by themselves - but, as publicist Matt Wright later stated, "Waking Bullets just wasn't really coming together as an album," and the project was shelved. Wright then released a promo EP to blogs titled Blitzen Trapper Advance Album Sampler Promo Thingy, containing the track "On a Dime," which was later included on the Portland-based PDX Pop Now! 2006 compilation album.

This paved the way for Blitzen Trapper's breakthrough album, 2007's Wild Mountain Nation, which Earley describes as "a record that sounded like it had been authored by a drunken scarecrow who had been dragged behind a truck." Their final self-released full-length studio record, Nation found even more acclaim with critics than Field Rexx. PopMatters.com raved that "Wild Mountain Nation is indeed a rare gift—a music reviewer's dream come true." Pitchfork rated the record "Best New Music" and granted an 8.5-star review, stating, "Compared to their previous albums, Wild Mountain Nation has a newfound and audible confidence. It's the work of an assured band who can not only treat genre like so much fingerpaint, but brave enough to play it straight for a minute -- not as an empty exercise, but a chance to aspire ... Wild Mountain Nation is a revelation from beginning to end." For the first time, Blitzen Trapper released an official music video, a half-animated/half-live action clip promoting the title track, directed by Orie Weeks III. Rolling Stone named the track one of the best of 2007, placing it at 98 and calling it "A shambling, hypermelodic jam from Portland, Oregon, indie boys down with Native American culture ... and the best Grateful Dead knockoff in forever." The influential magazine Spin promoted an exclusive track titled "Boss King," which raised awareness of the group despite the fact that the song wasn't on the new record.

In September 2007, acclaimed indie studio Daytrotter conducted their first interview with Blitzen Trapper and invited the group to perform four acoustic tracks; this was the start of a long relationship between the band and the studio. A month later, the band released their first EP, containing outtakes from Wild Mountain Nation (including "Boss King"), as well as "Jericho," a song from the Daytrotter session that is the first Blitzen Trapper song to not feature Earley on lead vocals (Marty Marquis, who wrote the song, does the honors).

In 2007, Blitzen Trapper signed to the indie label Sub Pop.

2008–2012: Sub Pop

 Furr 

In September 2008, Blitzen Trapper released their first record for Sub Pop records, Furr, to near-universal critical acclaim. As with Wild Mountain Nation, the new album was recorded in an old telegraph building by the Willamette River in Portland, Oregon, in the group's studio at Sally Mack's School of Dance. Essentially living at the studio, head writer and lead singer Eric Earley worked on many of the songs late at night when the other bands in the space had gone. One of the main components of the album's sound was a barely usable out-of-tune piano discovered at the studio one day, and featuring on the tracks, "Not Your Lover" and "Echo." Referring to it as a "timely, honest record," Earley recalls of the recording process,

But Furr was a record that spoke from new perspectives we'd gained on the road. It was me becoming aware of the past I'd been trying to forget, and of the greater world around me. It's no surprise that the opening track is a dream-like treatise on the state of the western world.

The album was an immediate critical hit. Rolling Stone gave it four out of five stars, calling it, "an engaging album full of rootsy beauty: gorgeous, wilderness-wandering ballads like 'Stolen Shoes & a Rifle' offer all the benefits of a great pastoral folk-rock record, but Blitzen also toss in ragged guitars, cheap keyboards and mildly weird psych rock on jams such as "Fire and Fast Bullets" ... Throughout the album, Blitzen keep their songs highly tuneful, making Furr a breakthrough..." The magazine also profiled the band in a two-page feature titled "Blitzen Trapper's American Pastoral,", listed Furr on its "50 Best Albums of 2008" and the title track placed at #4 on its "100 Best Singles of 2008."

More critical acclaim followed: The A.V. Club called Furr Blitzen Trapper's "most focused album yet" in its A− review, while Pitchfork gave it another 8.5, saying that Furr is "an essential 13-song LP with no filler." For the first time, the band got national television exposure by performing "Furr" on Late Night With Conan O'Brien, and further promoted the album with two videos: one for "Furr," directed by Jade Harris (a "stop motion video featuring thousand[s] of paper cut outs") and "Black River Killer," an atmospheric clip directed by Daniel Elkayam. All the effort paid off: Furr was Blitzen Trapper's most popular album yet, reaching 189 on the Billboard "Top 200" chart, and hit 22 on the Top Independent Chart and went as high as #6 on the Heatseekers chart.

The band launched into a massive tour in support of Furr, traveling all over the United States and Canada, and venturing overseas to venues in Belgium, the Netherlands, Germany, and more. Festival appearances proliferated: on March 19, 2008, the band played the prestigious SXSW Festival as a part of the Sub Pop Showcase in the Radio Room. Next came the Monolith Festival, at the Red Rocks Amphitheater in Colorado in mid-September, followed by an April 17, 2009 appearance at the enormously popular Coachella Music Festival for the first time, under headliners The Killers, and sharing the date with artists such as Amy Winehouse and Drive-By Truckers. Rolling Stone commented on the band's Coachella performance, stating, "the six-piece Blitzen Trapper rode wild flights of guitar melody and feedback, with extended tunes of fuzz and contemplation." Coachella was only the beginning of Blitzen Trapper's busy 2009: they played the Pitchfork Music Festival in July, and a month later appeared at Lollapalooza under headliners Soundgarden, Green Day, and Lady Gaga, and in June, Blitzen Trapper played the Bonnaroo Music and Arts Festival for the first time. This performance elicited even more effusive praise from Rolling Stone: "their harmonies were crystalline and soaring, gleaming against the music's ragged backdrop. While classic American music is their source material, the band is devoted to radically rearranging it, scuffing it up and refitting it to serve their own purposes."

On April 18, 2009, Blitzen Trapper released its first 7" vinyl single for Record Store Day: "War Is Placebo"/"Booksmart Baby"; the record was a color vinyl limited to only 1500 copies. Band member Marty Marquis explained the genesis of the tracks: "The A side was part of the abortive Waking Bullets record, B side was recorded as part of something Earley ended up calling "Wooden Dress and Dresser Set", the same source as 'Going Down' and 'Shoulder Full of You' off the tour EP." The tour EP in question was a CD-R of a new EP called EP3 featuring five non-album songs the band had been selling at shows. Some of the songs, such as "Big Black Bird" and "Preacher's Sister's Boy" were also remnants of the aborted Waking Bullets at Breakneck Speed project; an early version of one song, "Silver Moon," had been released as part of the Blitzen Trapper Advance Album Sampler Promo Thingy. When the band released the collection commercially through Sub Pop, they included the Furr version of the song "Black River Killer"; consequentially, the name changed from EP3 to Black River Killer EP. The EP managed to make a significant splash on the Billboard charts, placing at #22 on the Heatseekers Chart.

 Destroyer of the Void 

With the tour over, a new album was imminent. Band member Marty Marquis hinted at the direction of the new album, stating, "We've got a bunch of new material and have also gone back and looked at a bunch of unreleased stuff that we think are really strong tunes that would make a contribution with the new stuff," further explaining that the song, "The Tailor," would be "a really crazy, psychedelic tale along the lines of Furr, but the arrangements are not so folky and simple. The tale itself and the poetry that expresses it is, I think, the next level above what we did with Furr."

Marquis also came up with the name for the new album, Destroyer of the Void; Eric Earley admitted, "I couldn't think of a name for it." Released in 2010, most of Destroyer was recorded by Mike Coykendall (like some of the earlier, mostly abortive Waking Bullets at Breakneck Speed tracks) and mixed by Earley and bassist Michael Van Pelt at Coykendall's Blue Rooms Studios in Portland. National Public Radio provided a full stream of the album in late May 2010, calling the album, "another ambitious and stylistically diverse curveball." Director Daniel Elkayam, who had previously directed the "Black River Killer" video, created a mystical, soft-lit clip for the album's "The Tree" (featuring Alela Diane).

Prepublicity also came from within: drummer Brian Adrian Koch created an eerie, horror-movie-esque promo video for the album, hinting at the new sonic directions of the album, and the band's newly revamped website offered a stream of the album's "Dragon Song" and a download of a demo version of "Heaven and Earth." Earley described the somewhat hodgepodge nature of the record:

I had already cobbled together a new record during the previous year of touring, Destroyer of the Void, a patchwork of songs from my past and present which hung together like a house of cards. But there were certain glimmers of where Blitzen Trapper was heading, a certain feeling of open road and of heartfelt loss.

Blitzen Trapper was invited by influential rock band Pavement to play the All Tomorrow's Parties festival on May 15, 2010, an invitation Earley later remembered fondly: "We toured with Stephen Malkmus [of Pavement] and he was a big hero of mine in high school, so that was really fun." On May 21, 2010, the band played a full televised set on the Netherlands' VPRO broadcast network, with a focus on highlighting the songs from the new album, including "Destroyer of the Void," "Love and Hate," "Evening Star," and more. The band played the album's "Dragon Song" on Late Night With Jimmy Fallon on June 17 of that year, and, as part of an extensive tour in the United States and abroad, took part in the Crossing Border Festival in Amsterdam, one of the most massive music and literature festivals in Europe. as well as the Newport Folk Festival in July. Reviews for the album were good. Pitchfork proffered a 7.5 rating, while Rolling Stone championed the record as, "Trading low-fi ruggedness for gorgeous Americana pop, they conjure Dylan circa John Wesley Harding and proggy ELO but with bong-stoked epiphanies all their own." Following the tour, longtime band member Drew Laughery left the band, as Eric Earley was impatient to get to the new album: "I wrote American Goldwing, our third Sub Pop release, in a span of six months, recorded most of it, and then we went on tour for Destroyer of the Void...all the time knowing that this new record I'd recorded was the real record, the Blitzen Trapper record to come."

 American Goldwing 

Writing American Goldwing came easily for Eric Earley. "I usually write songs pretty fast, in like 20-30 minutes. For the new record I wrote them all in a month or so. I'm not a good deliberator, I get out a guitar and it comes to me." In his Sub Pop assessment of the band and his own songwriting, Earley indicates a tragedy, "a death of which I can't speak," spurring on the writing and recording of the album. Despite the very personal nature of the songwriting (Earley even indicated that the record had originally been intended as a solo effort), American Goldwing became the first Blitzen Trapper album to which creators outside the band were invited to collaborate. Bassist Michael Van Pelt suggested bringing in Grammy-winning producer and audio engineer Tchad Blake to mix the album, and Portland-based producer Gregg Williams (Quarterflash, The Dandy Warhols), who had recorded some of the tracks for the Waking Bullets at Breakneck Speed project, co-produced all the tracks on the record.

Sub Pop released two trailer videos for the album, one straightforward clip featuring Earley riding in the back of a truck, underscored by musical snippets of "Might Find it Cheap" and "Stranger in a Strange Land", and a more surreal movie-trailer video, featuring a narrator with a spooky-seductive French accent, murderous clowns, and bodies floating in swimming pools, based around "Street Fighting Sun". Continuing the fun, creepy vibe, the band released a short movie titled The Blitzen Trapper Massacre, produced and directed by comedian and actor Rainn Wilson (of NBC's The Office, starring as a psychotic fan) and Joshua Homnick and written by Wilson and Blitzen Trapper's Brian Adrian Koch; the film debuted on the site Funny Or Die. No fewer than three official music videos accompanied the album: "Love the Way You Walk Away" - the first video featuring the full band in a live-action performance - directed by Patrick Stanton; "Girl in a Coat," directed by "Black River Killer" and "The Tree" director Daniel Elkayam; and "Taking It Easy Too Long," directed by Blitzen Trapper drummer and filmmaker Brian Adrian Koch. In addition, director and photographer Rich Tarbell directed a series of live performances for WNRN, a public radio station based in Charlottesville, Virginia. Finally, in anticipation of the new full-length record, the band once again participated in Record Store Day on April 16, 2011, offering the 7" vinyl single, "Maybe Baby/Soul Singer." Only 1500 copies of the single were produced, and all came with a download code.

Blitzen Trapper released American Goldwing on September 13, 2011, to mainly positive reviews. AllMusic pegged the record as "a straight-up, mid-'70s inspired Southern rock album that fuses the Saturday night swagger of Lynyrd Skynyrd with the stoic peasantry of The Band," while Rolling Stone called it an "intoxicating roots fantasy." On release date, the band played an in-store live set of mostly new tracks (and one Led Zeppelin cover) at Easy Street Records in Seattle, Washington. The album made waves on various Billboard charts, as well, placing at #104 on the Billboard 200, 32 on Top Rock Albums, #20 on the Alternative Albums chart, #19 on the Tastemaker chart, and as high as #4 on the Folk Albums chart. A major tour followed, highlighted by appearances at festivals such as Bumbershoot, Doe Bay, Blues & Roots, and the Newport Folk Festival, a co-headlining slot at 2012's Pickathon festival, and several shows at which Blitzen Trapper played with the popular and influential alt-rock band Wilco. In April 2012, the band once again released a 7" single for Record Store Day, this time a cover of Jimi Hendrix's version of "Hey Joe," backed with "Skirts On Fire." It was the largest limited release yet: 1800 copies, pressed on yellow vinyl.

Following the tour, the band reached back into its past. On the following Record Store Day (April 20, 2013), and in celebration of its tenth anniversary as Blitzen Trapper, the band released a remastered vinyl version of their first, eponymous, album on vinyl, with five unearthed bonus tracks included. Remastered specifically for vinyl by Bruce Barielle, only 1,000 black vinyl copies were pressed, with 200 "Coke bottle clear" records mixed in randomly with the release; all copies included a digital download code. Rolling Stone heralded the new release with a streaming preview of one of the bonus tracks - "On a Tuesday" - about which Earley stated, "Not sure I recall what the song's even about – something sad, that's for sure."

Despite the look into its distant past, the band was also heading into a new future. Blitzen Trapper prepared its seventh studio album, with a somewhat new direction ... and a new record label.

2013–2016: Vagrant Records

 VII 

On October 1, 2013, Blitzen Trapper released their seventh album, appropriately titled VII, on Vagrant Records, their first album with a new label since 2008's Furr. Eric Earley described VII as "hillbilly gangster," saying:

It's just me wanting to mix that dark, gangster vibe with the kind of music I grew up listening to and see if it can kind of make sense ... It seems to work. It's a good vehicle for telling stories, too.

The early media hype for VII was strong, with the band playing a short live set for The Current studios (performing the new songs "Shine On," "Thirsty Man," and "Don't Be a Stranger.") Rolling Stone offering an exclusive stream of the new track "Ever Loved Once", and the Chicago-based radio station WXRT providing a free download of the song "Shine On," complete with a commentary track by Earley and guest vocalist Liz Vice. In December, two months after the album was released, the station followed up this giveaway with another: a free download of the song, "Thirsty Man," also from VII. "Thirsty Man" was also released as a single on iTunes, with additional non-album tracks "The Prophet" and "Plenty of Thrills."

This single did very well for Blitzen Trapper, propelled by a music video directed by Portland-based photographer Robbie Augspurger, described as a "surreal and goofy take on noir tropes" by Stereogum. For the first time ever, the band placed on a singles chart on Billboard, with "Thirsty Man" hitting #29 on the Adult Alternative Songs chart. The album itself fared well on the charts, peaking at #41 on the Independent Albums chart and #11 on the Folk Albums chart.

A tour in support of the record followed, including appearances at festivals such as the Cultivate Music Festival, the First City Festival, the Mountain Jam Festival, and the 2013 FloydFest (theme: "Rise & Shine"), the popular world music and arts festival held annually near Floyd, Virginia. The tour continued into 2014, including two longer stands at Portland's Doug Fir Lounge, and a nine-show stint with the influential rock band, Drive-By Truckers. In February, Rolling Stone premiered a streaming outtake from VII titled "Coming Home"; Eric Earley stated that "with this track we wanted to lay down some good old-fashioned country funk, with horns and banjos side by side ... It recalls the swampy truck stop sounds of Jim Ford or Mac Davis, telling ourselves that home is just around the bend." The band, through their British label Lojinx would later release the song as a free download on Soundcloud. It wouldn't be the last time that year that the band would release outtakes from VII: in accordance with tradition, Blitzen Trapper released a new 7" vinyl single for Record Store Day, consisting of two unreleased tracks from the VII sessions: "Hold On" and "On a Dime Woman" (this latter is not to be confused with the Waking Bullets at Breakneck Speed outtake "On a Dime"; the two are different songs).

 Live In Portland 

On December 17, 2014, the band announced that its first-ever live album was imminent, featuring songs culled from three shows played over November 29 and 30 at the Doug Fir Lounge the previous year. Titled Live In Portland, the tracks selected for this record would be spread fairly evenly from Blitzen Trapper's career, with one song from the Cool Love#1 EP, two songs from Wild Mountain Nation, three from VII, five from American Goldwing (including the bonus track, "Street Fighting Sun"), and six songs from Furr. Live In Portland would feature no songs from Blitzen Trapper, Field Rexx, or Destroyer of the Void. Rather than release a physical album or an album through media outlets such as iTunes, Blitzen Trapper made Live In Portland downloadable (or streaming) for free, or as a "name your price" download through the website Bandcamp. Explaining the intent of the album, Eric Earley said:

This is our first release of any live material and it's got everything I like about our live show, it's intimate, it's messy and it's grounded in our interaction on stage, just these guys that grew up together playing songs and messing around on a stage. This is for all the fans who've seen us and know that when we're performing we're trying to give as much as we possibly can. So it's also our gift to the fans, a free live thing for the Holidays.

Not counting the re-release of their eponymous first album in 2013, Live In Portland is the first full-length album released on Blitzen Trapper's personal label, LidKerCow, since 2007's Wild Mountain Nation.

 Live Harvest 

On February 14, 2015, the band announced their next release would also be a live album recorded at the Doug Fir Lounge, this time as a Record Store Day exclusive. Recorded on October 17 at the Doug Fir Lounge in Portland, Oregon at the end of the VII tour, Live Harvest is a song-for-song interpretation of Neil Young's 1972 album Harvest. Live Harvest was released on April 18 as a 180 gram vinyl LP with a download card. Explaining the impetus for performing the album, Earley stated, "We all love Neil and that record has a lot of songs that everyone recognizes ... We wanted it to be something that the fans can connect with as we play it. Plus, it's an easy record. The songs are so well-written and smooth -- it's really easy and fun to play."

Unusually, while Eric Earley sings lead on most of the album's tracks, keyboardist Marty Marquis (who had previously sung lead on only one other Blitzen Trapper song, "Jericho") sings lead on "A Man Needs a Maid," while drummer Brian Adrian Koch sings lead for the first time on "The Needle and the Damage Done." The band launched a short tour in support of the record, including stops at several City Winery locations in New York, Nashville, and Chicago, in which they played Harvest in its entirety, as well as Blitzen Trapper songs.

 All Across This Land 

On April 22, 2015, the band announced that new album All Across This Land would be released on October 2 via Vagrant Records in the US and Lojinx in Europe; the band's official site confirmed this on July 22, 2015, providing album art and a full roster of tour dates. The announcement stated, "Really hope you guys enjoy this one - we think it's our best yet."

In April of the same year, in an interview with Delaware Online, Eric Earley hinted at the direction of All Across This Land: "It's a little more of a live, aggressive record. It's probably the truest-sounding to our live show ... In certain ways, it harkens back to American Goldwing or even maybe some stuff on Furr. It's a return to a classic rock sort of thing." The band began playing a new song, "Rock & Roll Is Made For You," near the end of the Live Harvest tour, and while Delaware Online suggested that that might be the new album's title, the rumor was soon dispelled by Marty Marquis.

Another short tour followed the official Live Harvest tour, beginning at WhiskeyTown in Portland. In anticipation of the tour's third show at Missoula, Montana's Top Hat Lounge, website Missoulan provided the new album's real name, All Across This Land. The site also indicated that the performance would not only include songs from Live Harvest, but also several songs from the new album. Following the show, the official Twitter account of the band verified that several of the songs played the previous night were cuts from the new record: "Lonesome Angel," "Rock N Roll Was Made For You," "Mystery & Wonder," "Across the River," and "All Across This Land." The band's British label Lojinx released an album trailer for the new record on July 17, and the band officially previewed the album on July 22, offering a free stream of the new song, "Lonesome Angel" on their Soundcloud account.

Following the October 2, 2015 release of the album, Blitzen Trapper went on a tour of the United States that continued through the end of the year. In early 2016, they took the tour to the UK, starting in February at Le Botanique in Brussels, Belgium.

On November 16, 2015, the television show Fargo aired the episode "Rhinoceros," featuring Blitzen Trapper's cover of the song "I Am a Man of Constant Sorrow." The song later appeared on January 15, 2016, as part of an EP containing the second single from All Across This Land, "Mystery & Wonder," and a live version of "Let the Cards Fall."

 Live at Third Man Records 

Blitzen Trapper's first new recording of 2016 was a song titled "Summer Rain," released as part of Amazon's "Sounds of Summer" playlist. "It's remembering hot summers when the rains were a relief, memories from childhood mostly when the days were long and full of adventure," Eric Earley stated. Announced by Rolling Stone on May 13 (with a link to stream the new song), the playlist was released exclusively for streaming on June 3.

On July 5, 2016, the band announced a new acoustic fall tour titled "Songbook: A Night of Stories and Songs," intending it to be a "stripped-down acoustic experience ... telling stories and sharing the inspirations behind some of their most beloved songs, including those from their favorite songwriters and influences." Initially the tour was scheduled for midwest and southern dates, but on August 23, the band announced west coast dates, as well.

Paste magazine announced Blitzen Trapper's third live album, Live at Third Man Records on August 17, 2016. Recorded live and direct-to-acetate on the Blue Room Stage at Jack White's Third Man Records, the vinyl recording was released on September 1, 2016. Focusing mainly on live versions of songs from All Across This Land, the ten-song album also included "Texaco" and "Love the Way You Walk Away," two live versions of songs from earlier studio albums that had not figured on their previous live album, Live in Portland. On August 15, 2016, the band announced via their Facebook page that they had embarked on the recording their ninth studio record.

2017–Present: Return to LidKerCow

 Wild and Reckless 

In mid-August 2016, Blitzen Trapper began recording what they called "Record #9." Three tweets on their Twitter account captured the band in the studio: one video of Koch laying down a drum track, plus two photographs: one of Earley at a Hammond B3 Organ and another of Earley and Marquis at keyboards.

In late 2016, the website for Portland Center Stage at The Armory announced a new theatrical experience featuring Blitzen Trapper. According to the site:

Portland folk rockers Blitzen Trapper refuse to be pinned down and boxed in. The acclaimed band has mixed genre after genre into their musical arsenal over the fifteen years of playing together. Now they're unleashing their sound — and knack for lyrical storytelling — on the PCS stage. They've mined their Oregonian roots to create a show that asks: What's the sound of a life falling through the cracks? Fusing the energy of a rock concert with the imaginative possibility of the theater, Blitzen Trapper and PCS join forces in this new project, tracing the unforgettable stories of ordinary Americans caught in an extraordinary struggle to not get left behind.

Billed as a "new musical event," Wild and Reckless was co-directed by Rose Riordan and Liam Kaas-Lentz; performances ran from March 16, 2017 to April 30, 2017. The band released a limited-edition companion album containing ten tracks - "Black River Killer" (from Furr), "Below the Hurricane" (from Destroyer of the Void), and "Astronaut" (from American Goldwing), along with seven tracks recorded exclusively for Wild and Reckless. The release was limited to only 500 vinyl pressings and 500 CDs, sold only at performances of the show. In anticipation of the show, Entertainment Weekly previewed one of the new tracks, "Love Live On," via SoundCloud.

Writing
Bandleader Eric Earley, who began playing music at the age of three, writes most of the band's music. On November 16, 2015, American Songwriter'' magazine named Blitzen Trapper, specifically Earley, the Songwriter of the Week. When asked what his typical songwriting process is like, Earley responded, "It's different for every song. Generally, it just depends on the type of song. If it's a story song, I'll start with the words. If it's not, sometimes it starts with the music, sometimes it's sparked by someone else's song or someone's story they tell me." Earley named Michael Stipe, Son Volt's Jay Farrar, Bob Dylan, and Neil Young as primary songwriting influences.

Members
 Eric Earley – lead vocals, lead and rhythm guitar, keyboard, harmonica, banjo
 Erik Menteer – lead, rhythm and slide guitar, percussion, moog synthesizer
 Brian Adrian Koch – drums, backup vocals, harmonica
 Michael Van Pelt – bass, bird whistle, percussion, harmonica
 Marty Marquis - rhythm guitar, backup and occasional lead vocals, keyboard, harmonica, percussion, melodica

Discography

Studio albums

Live albums

Album reissue

As Garmonbozia

EPs

7" Singles

References

External links
Blitzen Trapper's official website
Blitzen Trapper's artist page on Sub Pop Records' website

Blitzen Trapper collection at the Internet Archive's live music archive

American alternative country groups
Indie rock musical groups from Oregon
Lojinx artists
Musical groups established in 2000
Musical groups from Portland, Oregon
Sub Pop artists
2000 establishments in Oregon
American indie folk groups
Vagrant Records artists
Third Man Records artists